Indus script, or Harappan script, is a corpus of symbols produced by the Indus Valley Civilisation.

Indus script may also refer to:

 Kharosthi script
 Sharada script